Landon School is a private, college preparatory school for boys in grades 3–12, with an enrollment of approximately 680 students, in Bethesda, Maryland, just outside Washington, D.C.

Background
Paul Landon Banfield and his wife, Mary Lee, founded Landon School in 1929. The school's first location was a former residence in the Sheridan-Kalorama neighborhood of Washington, D.C., now home to the Embassy of Estonia. Banfield moved Landon to its present  campus in Bethesda in 1935. The farmhouse, stables, and barn from the previous use of the Bethesda property still stand on the campus and are used today.

The school has a reputation for cultivating athletes.

Demographics
The demographic breakdown of the 690 boys enrolled for the 2022-2023 school year was:

41% of the student body identified as non-Hispanic white.
Native American/Alaskan – 0%
Asian – 7.7%
Latino/Hispanic – 5%
Middle Eastern American – 1.9%
International students – 2.3%
Black – 15.2%
Multiracial – 6.4%
Caucasian – 59%
Other - 3%

Academics
Landon School is a college preparatory school for boys in grades 3-12. The school’s daily schedule is from 8:00 a.m. – 3:40 p.m., with flexible and extended hours for before/aftercare and athletics. The school states that the schedule for each division is age-appropriately designed to maximize students’ most attentive hours.  

The Lower School schedule includes periods for each subject, consisting of language arts, science, social studies, math, music, and ethics classes, broken up by movement opportunities, athletics training, and quiet reading time.

Middle School and Upper School utilize rotating block schedules that are similarly designed to maximize students’ attention, with breaks for movement and club meetings in between. In 2023, the School plans to move the sixth grade from the Middle School to the Lower School.

In 2018, Landon announced it would discontinue AP courses to focus on offering its own set of high-level “advanced” courses that better align with their Mission, Philosophy, and Portrait of a Graduate. 84% of the Class of 2022 is attending a college or university where they applied for early decision or early action.

Funded by its namesake Cary M. Maguire ’46, the Maguire Ethics Scholarship Program awards a merit-based scholarship of $10,000 to a student entering Upper School who demonstrates the highest standards of ethics, integrity, and character. Scholarships are available to both new applicants and current eighth-grade students. 

In the fall of the 2002-2003 school year, ten Landon students were caught cheating on their SAT exams. Among these students were eight who admitted to the offense one month later after rumors had spread throughout the school. Those eight students were suspended for the remaining month of the fall semester, though they were allowed to take their fall semester exams. Two other students were pressed to withdraw from Landon or face expulsion.

Extracurriculars
The school offers 22 athletics options, including varsity interscholastic sports such as swimming, soccer, water polo, football, cross country, ice hockey, wrestling, basketball, baseball, track, tennis, golf, rugby and lacrosse. Landon also offers interscholastic club sports such as riflery, sailing, fencing, squash and ultimate Frisbee, as well as intramural sports and strength and conditioning.

In collaboration with Holton-Arms School, Landon School performs three productions per year, a musical and a non musical. In addition to acting, students can learn lighting, sound and set design. The School offers theatrical class, boys Improv Club and Director's Workshop where students can create and direct their own original play.

Additionally, the school teaches arts such as painting, advanced drawing, architecture, ceramics, digital art, sculpture and photojournalism. Students can submit their work to regional and national competitions or to the school's on campus magazine entitled, Prometheus Unbound.

During the COVID-19 pandemic, Landon students used their time outside of the classroom to assist those in need. Upper School student TJ Kim started "Operation Supplies Over Skies," allowing him to use his pilot's license to deliver donated medical supplies to remote hospitals in need. Storm Templeton started a small community project and then it developed into a larger community effort to deliver face shields to D.C. firefighters while Alex Henderson crafted masks for nurses and first responders.

Athletics 
Landon competes in the Interstate Athletic Conference (IAC) alongside six other all boys’ schools in D.C., MD, and VA. The IAC consists of 12 sports: baseball, basketball, cross country, football, golf, ice hockey, lacrosse, soccer, swimming and diving, tennis, track and field, and wrestling.

The School's 75-acre campus includes two gymnasiums, a wrestling room, a 5,500-square-foot strength and conditioning area, a turf field with a track, four grass fields, 10 outdoor tennis courts, two baseball fields, an outdoor swimming pool, two miles of cross country trails, and a riflery range. The ice hockey team practices at the Bears’ Den at Rockville Ice Arena.

Lacrosse

In 2017, Landon was in the top 2 of USA Today’s Super 25 boys lacrosse rankings.

Controversies 
In spring 2010, it was revealed that students allegedly planned a fantasy football-like "draft" in which female students at other local schools were chosen for each "team," and "points" were to be scored on the basis of sexual encounters with those students. The revelations came in the wake of the news about George Huguely V—a former Landon lacrosse player and football quarterback—who was charged in the murder of his girlfriend Yeardley Love.

In September 2022, several Landon School students were seen in a viral video singing a racial slur while riding the Washington Metro. The school issued a statement that it was aware of the incident and "deeply concerned".

Notable alumni

 Sam Anas – hockey player for Iowa Wild
 Jaye Andrews – former professional basketball player in the British Basketball League
 Darion Atkins – basketball  player for SIG Strasbourg of the French Pro A League
 Ned Bittinger – portrait painter and illustrator
 Todd Boehly – part-owner of the Los Angeles Dodgers and Chelsea Football Club
 Robbie Bordley – first modern-era captain of the United States national rugby union team, teacher and renowned lacrosse coach at Landon School
 Alan Brinkley – historian and Columbia University provost from 2003 to 2009
 Donald Dell – former Davis Cup player and coach
 Bill Eacho – former US Ambassador to Austria (2009–2012)
 Nicholas Hammond – American actor
 Fred Hetzel – played six seasons in NBA, top pick of 1965 NBA draft
 Rush Holt – physicist and former Congressman (1999–2015) (D-NJ)
 George Huguely – University of Virginia student convicted of second-degree murder
 Ken Jenkins – NFL running back and kick return specialist
 Rufus G. King III – Chief Judge, DC Superior Court, 2000–2008
 Knight Kiplinger – editor-in-chief of Kiplinger's Personal Finance magazine
 Bronson La Follette – Wisconsin Attorney General from 1974 to 1986
 Gregory S. Martin – retired U.S. Air Force four-star general
  Nick Martin  – founder and CEO of TechChange 
 James McEwan – whitewater canoeing bronze medalist at 1972 Summer Olympics
 Doug McKelway – television journalist for Fox News
 Fred McNair – professional tennis player, 1976 French Open doubles champion
 Sam Potolicchio – educator 
 Maury Povich – television personality, host of Maury, a syndicated talk show
 Ted Rogers – former NFL Super Bowler
 Danny Rubin (born 1991) – American-Israeli basketball player for Bnei Herzliya of the Israeli Basketball Premier League
 Jonathan D. Schiller – American lawyer who is a co-founder and managing partner of the law firm Boies Schiller Flexner LLP
 Tom Scott – co-founded Nantucket Nectars
 Teddy Sears – actor
 Topper Shutt – TV weatherman
 Thomas Tamm – US Justice Department attorney, illegal wiretapping whistleblower
 Thomas Wadden – Professor of Psychology in Psychiatry at the Perelman School of Medicine at the University of Pennsylvania
 Matt Ward – Tewaaraton Trophy winner and NCAA lacrosse All-American

References

External links
Landon School website

Boys' schools in Maryland
 Educational institutions established in 1929
Private elementary schools in Montgomery County, Maryland
Private middle schools in Montgomery County, Maryland
Private high schools in Montgomery County, Maryland
Preparatory schools in Maryland
1929 establishments in Maryland
Schools in Bethesda, Maryland